Heteromyza oculata is a species of fly in the family Heleomyzidae. It is found in Europe and North America. Males of this species have much larger eyes than females.

References

Heleomyzidae
Articles created by Qbugbot
Insects described in 1820